Sdelka!? (Cyrillic: Сделка!?, Russian for "deal") is the Russian version of Deal or No Deal.  It was broadcast on REN TV from April 17 to September 22, 2006, and hosted by Alexei Veselkin.  The prizes available ranged from 3,000,000 Russian rubles (about US$98,000, €69,000 or £61,000) to 1 kopek (smallest Russian unit of currency, less than 1 US cent, euro cent or penny).

The music used was taken from various other Deal or No Deal versions, like Miljoenenjacht (Theme), UK Deal or No Deal and Australian Deal or No Deal (various incidentals).

There are 22 cases held on a podium with 22 players that return each show like on Deal or No Deal UK, but they have briefcases rather than boxes. The show's set is similar to that of the American one, but the set is a lot smaller.

Case Values

External links
Official site

Deal or No Deal
Russian game shows
2006 Russian television series debuts
2006 Russian television series endings
2000s Russian television series